Buccio di Ranallo (c. 1294 – 1363) was an Italian poet and writer, known for a historical chronicle (Cronica) about L'Aquila, his native town, which covers the period from 1254 to 1362.

Bibliography 
 

1290s births
1363 deaths
Italian male poets
14th-century Italian poets
14th-century Italian writers
People from L'Aquila